Brian O'Callaghan (born 24 February 1981 in Limerick, Ireland) is a professional footballer, plays for his home town club Limerick in the League of Ireland Premier Division. He began his career at Barnsley, where he scored once against Mansfield. After leaving Barnsley, O'Callaghan joined Notts County for whom he scored once against Wycombe Wanderers.

Honours
Cork City
FAI Cup (1): 2007

Limerick
League of Ireland First Division (1): 2012
Munster Senior Cup (1): 2011-12
Regional United (1): 2014-2017

References

External links
Kickin Magazine

1981 births
Living people
Republic of Ireland association footballers
Barnsley F.C. players
Notts County F.C. players
Cork City F.C. players
Halifax Town A.F.C. players
Sportspeople from Limerick (city)
League of Ireland players
English Football League players
National League (English football) players
Association football defenders